Edward Mullen (born 22 June 1949) is a British judoka. He competed in the men's lightweight event at the 1972 Summer Olympics.

References

1949 births
Living people
British male judoka
Olympic judoka of Great Britain
Judoka at the 1972 Summer Olympics
Place of birth missing (living people)